Nechako Lakes is a provincial electoral district in British Columbia, Canada.  It was established by the Electoral Districts Act, 2008, came into effect upon the dissolution of the British Columbia Legislature in April 2009, and was first contested in the 2009 election.  The district includes the northern communities of Burns Lake, Vanderhoof, Houston and surrounding areas.

Geography

As of the 2020 provincial election, Nechako Lakes comprises almost the entire area within the Regional District of Bulkley-Nechako, located in central British Columbia. Communities in the electoral district consist of Vanderhoof, Houston, Burns Lake, Fort St. James, Fraser Lake and Granisle. Notable regional communities not in this electoral district include Smithers and Telkwa, which are part of the Stikine Electoral District.

History

Member of Legislative Assembly 
Nechako Lakes's MLA is John Rustad of the Conservative Party of British Columbia. He was initially elected to the Prince George-Omineca riding, a predecessor of Nechako Lakes.

Election results

References

CBC results map

British Columbia provincial electoral districts